Styrbjörn Holm (14 February 1928 – 20 January 1994) was a Swedish sailor who competed in the 1964 Summer Olympics.

References

1928 births
1994 deaths
Swedish male sailors (sport)
Olympic sailors of Sweden
Sailors at the 1964 Summer Olympics – Dragon